Celtis sinensis (English: Chinese hackberry;;) is a species of flowering plant in the hemp family, Cannabaceae, that is native to slopes in East Asia.

Description 
It is a tree that grows to 20 m tall, with deciduous leaves and gray bark. The fruit is a globose drupe, 5–7(–8) mm in diameter. Flowering occurs in March–April, and fruiting in September–October.

Distribution, habitat and uses 
Native to slopes at altitudes of 100–1500 m in Anhui, Fujian, Gansu, Guangdong, Guizhou, Henan, Jiangsu, Jiangxi, Shandong, Zhejiang, Sichuan , as well as Korea (팽나무), Japan and Taiwan. Leaves and bark are used in Korean medicine to treat menstruation and lung abscess. It is a naturalized non-invasive species in North America. It is a declared noxious weed in many parts of eastern Australia.

As an ornamental plant, it is used in classical East Asian garden design.

See also
Great purple emperor

References

External links

sinensis
Trees of China
Trees of Japan
Trees of Korea
Plants described in 1805